The Rockford Register Star is the primary daily newspaper of the Rockford, Illinois, metropolitan area.  The fifth-highest circulation newspaper in Illinois, the Register Star takes its name from the 1979 merger of two predecessors, the Register Republic (founded , daily since ) and the Morning Star (founded ). The Register Star is currently owned by Gannett, which reacquired the paper upon merging with GateHouse Media in 2019. Gannett had previously owned the paper and its predecessors from 1967 to 2007.

Headquarters 
The newspaper is published from the Register Star Tower at 99 East State Street in Downtown Rockford, Illinois. Printing operations moved to Milwaukee in April 2020. The tower was built in 1930 and remains a Rockford landmark to this day, as it is still recognized as one of the most appealing buildings in downtown. It was designed to be similar in appearance to the Tribune Tower in Chicago.

Format 
The publication's general format is customary to that of most papers around the nation; it contains a front page and an "A" section, followed by local and state news, sports, and business throughout the work week. On Sundays it publishes the Sunday Register Star, where ads for national chains in the area are promoted along with the insertion of comics, the "Go" section, and USA Weekend magazine.

In 2003, the newspaper formed an alliance with WREX-TV. Newspaper reporters are seen on WREX-TV's newscasts on a daily basis promoting stories found in the Rockford Register Star, and the newspaper's website contains many videos of WREX's telecasted stories.

Sources 
GateHouse buys Rockford Register Star
Rockford Register Star

References

Publications established in 1855
Newspapers published in Illinois
Mass media in Rockford, Illinois
Gannett publications
1855 establishments in Illinois